Avraga Toson  is a spa resort in the Delgerkhaan sum (district) of Khentii Province in eastern Mongolia. The lakes at the resort have water with high concentration of mineral elements and yellow mud.

References 

Populated places in Mongolia